Norma Bailey (born 1949, in Gimli, Manitoba, Canada) is a Canadian film writer, producer, and director whose work is rooted in feminist and intersectional film theory. Bailey has directed several films, both in English and French and in various different genres, including fiction and non-fiction films. Her prolific career within the film industry has awarded her various awards and professional accolades including being named to the Order of Manitoba in 2010.

Career 

Norma Bailey graduated from the University of Manitoba and began her film career as a production assistant on David Cronenberg’s Rabid. She joined the National Film Board of Canada, and her first short, The Performer (1980), made for the Canada Vignettes series, won a jury prize for short film at the Cannes Film Festival. Bailey has since then had an extensive career writing, producing, and directing numerous shorts, documentaries, features, and television dramas including The Sheldon Kennedy Story for CTV, Cowboys and Indians: The Killing of J. J. Harper for CBC and the Genie Award–winning Bordertown Café in 1992 which was an adaptation of a play by Kelly Rebar. Norma Bailey also served as a producer for the ground-breaking four-part series Daughters of the Country about aboriginal women's interactions with white society.

Works

Feminism 
As a female Canadian director and producer Norma Bailey can be ranked among the greats. Her cinematic style is concisely centred around strong,  independent, and mature female characters. Bailey's distinct style showcasing strong female characters can be found in several of her films such as Nose and Tine (1980), The Wake (1866), and Ikwe (1986). It is through Bailey's dedication to showcasing female characters as powerful, ambitious, and independent that she can be considered as a feminist filmmaker in cinema. Female characters and women are not extensively portrayed beyond the stereotypical representations often used to describe womanhood and the feminine existence in the film and television industry. Therefore, Bailey's interpretation of women onscreen in inherently a feminist act of rebellion against the typical patriarchal values implemented in film and television.

Feminist film making is a cinematic art govern by feminist politics and theories rooted in social justice and most generally associated with the second wave of feminism. It is common for feminist filmmakers to create cinematic works based on the lived experiences of women and the feminist ideological framework of womanhood. Moreover, feminist filmmaking can be considered an act of liberation for women and a way to diffuse feminist ideologies to a wider audience of people. Norma Bailey stands out as a feminist filmmaker for her contributions in creating more realistic female representation and by repositioning the female voice and gaze throughout her films. A prime example of Norma Bailey's dedication to reshaping the ways in which women are represented in film and television is through her 1986 film The Wake, which was a part of The Daughters of the Country series.

The Wake 
The Wake was set in the 1980s in rural Alberta and told the story of a Métis woman named Joan and her love affair with a Royal Canadian Mounted Police officer named Jim. The film showcased Joan's experiences as a member of the Métis community and the effects cultural differences have on individuals.  Norma Bailey reimagined the experiences of Indigenous women from what had been previously showed through film and television and focused on creating a main character that was strong, independent, flawed, and relatable.

Throughout the film maternity and motherhood played an important role as Joan is a single mother of her own children and also takes on the role of caretaker for other children. Joan's character does not exemplify the idealized version of motherhood that is often perpetuated through mainstream cinema. She is flawed and makes mistakes which realigns the narrative towards a more feminist one that embraces motherhood as a constant state of difficulty and imperfection for most women which is perfectly normal. Women do not have a biologically predisposition that allows them to great mothers instantly and consistently and Joan demonstrates the reality of motherhood. Furthermore, motherhood is not Joan's only characteristic. She is portrayed to be a strong independent woman who desires to love and be loved. Therefore, dispelling the patriarchal idea that motherhood somehow converts women into non sexual beings to be fetishized by men. This cinematic rendering of women and motherhood creates this underlining feminist narrative throughout the film which contributes to the feminist filmmaking movement and to Norma Bailey's position within feminist filmmaking.

Furthermore, The Wake is centred in the genres of romance, drama, and western all of which typically position white people as being the main character and the hero. Bailey rejects this archetypal contextualization of her white character Jim and instead positions Joan, a Métis woman, as the sympathetic main character. Indigenous women are rarely depicted in the film and television industry and when they are it often plays into negative stereotypes. However, Bailey evokes the narrative that Indigenous woman can be fully developed relatable characters who fulfill all of the facets required for representation female characters in cinema.  The character of Joan in The Wake is actually the morally superior character between her and all of the white male characters which is highlighted throughout the film by her strong voice and judgment.

Norma Bailey did a majority of her pure feminist filmmaking in the 1980s which was an important and radical time for the feminist movement. The 1980s were a time of radical social change were feminist ideologies and activists were publicly addressing sexism alongside re-examining the movements internal racism and classism. The films Bailey wrote, produced, and directed in the 1980s showcased this ideological re-working of the feminist movement through her treatment and dedication to creating serious and respectful Indigenous led content. Bailey consciously tried to redirect and dispel any connotations of racism, sexism, and classism while creating cinema surrounding colonial oppression in Canada. A variety of her 1980s era films highlight the shifting ideological framework of the feminist movement towards intersectional feminism while working against cycles of colonial oppression within the film industry.

Taking into consideration the example of The Wake alongside a variety of her other films, it is easy to categorize Norma Bailey has an important feminist figure in the cinematic industry. Bailey has a distinctive perception of womanhood and the various roles women inhabit within society and portrays them onscreen to be representational of lived female experiences. She does not shy away from depicting true femininity and beautifully represents women as independent human beings who are capable of character and moral superiority over men and the patriarchal views, values, and ideals of womanhood commonly represented through cinema.

Decolonization 
Settler colonialism has implemented heteronormative and patriarchal norms that directly oppress many traditional Indigenous expressions, structures, and kinships regarding gender. Western ideologies are the social norm and liberally expressing any kind of variation from the mainstream is punished through social isolation and ridicule. Colonialism is therefore, a naturally sexist structural institution creating a gendered hierarchy which is forced upon societies that differ from their heteronormative view on gender roles. An example of the link between colonialism and sexism would be the 1876 Indian Act, which forced a patrilineal social structure onto the traditional Indigenous matrilineal organization of society.

Decolonization is an inherently feminist act because it is centred around dismantling an facet of the ancient and oppressive social hierarchy designed to enact racism and sexism within society.  Therefore, in order to make progress within the feminist movement there must be a collective understanding of colonial oppression and the violent trauma it has caused within Indigenous communities and among the generations of Indigenous peoples. Feminists and decolonization activist are fighting back against the same systems of social hierarchal oppression so, both movements are interconnected.

Throughout her extensive career Norma Bailey has written, produced, and directed several films that represent narratives other than her own, such as the experiences of Indigenous people and communities in Canada. However, Bailey avoids representing Indigenous peoples within the racist stereotypes commonly associated with them by colonial society. Such stereotypes include but are not limited to the dirty squaw, the noble savage, and finally the Indian princess. There is this important element of sympathy for the consequences inflicted upon Indigenous peoples, especially Indigenous women, by colonization and its hierarchal structures that enforce inequality and injustice within her movies. For example, in Bailey's 1986 film The Wake she resists judging the Indigenous female characters in the film for their wrongdoings and instead fixates on the condemnation of the white men who participate in oppressing these women. Although, Ikwe (1986) is arguably the film in Bailey extensive repertoire that best represents the relationship between colonial oppression and sexism, and the need for decolonization and feminist movements.

Ikwe 
Ikwe is a part of the Daughters of the Country short film series produced by Norma Bailey in 1986. The film is set in 1770 and follows the story of a young Ojibwa girl named Ikew who marries a Scottish fur trader, named Angus, and her journey leaving her home and tribe for the Georgian Bay shores with her husband.  Although the arranged union is potentially beneficial to her tribe, it results in a difficult life for Ikwe as her and her husband are never able to peacefully merge their cultures and create a unified home for themselves or their children. Traditional values and customs are in a constant state of clashing for Ikwe, though she believes her daughter has to power to create a new way of life using both of her parents cultures. Norma Bailey tells the story of conflicting cultures through they eyes of a young Indigenous woman and does not offer the perspective of settlers in the unfair realm of trade culture and the new hybrid culture it eventually created.

The film examines the relationship between Indigenous peoples and settlers in the fur trade and the consequences of those unfortunate alliances for the Indigenous women who were used as bargaining chips to ensure "fair" trades. Bailey showcases the settler characters as opinionated and ill-mannered opportunists in the early contact with Indigenous peoples and communities. Rightfully alluding to the eventual historical grotesque mistreatment and genocide of Indigenous peoples and cultures. While in a historic context Indigenous people did intentionally engage with the Europeans, they had no way of foreseeing the dangers that would accompany this decision would bring them and their future generations. Through Ikwe we are given a sense for foreshadowing to these dangers through the relationship between Ikwe and Angus, especially regarding the wellbeing of their children. The character of Ikwe is a by-product of her culture and she struggles throughout the film to adhere to colonial mainstream expectations of her as a woman, wife, and mother. She resists the Western patriarchal ideology that as a woman she must obey her husband and that his words and actions are law within the structure of their family. In many Indigenous cultures men and women complementary gender roles which are rooted in equality and mutual respect. However, colonial society gender roles were much stricter and were rooted in the belief and men were superior to women which denied women any right.

Norma Bailey pushed back from many colonial and sexist structures through the film Ikwe as she offered viewers a different version of colonialism and its historical impact then what is typically represented in film and television while creating an Indigenous centred perspective. Bailey worked within decolonization structures through her casting choices and use of traditional Indigenous language throughout the film. Ikwe used real Indigenous actors to play to roles of the Indigenous characters which was not common during the 1980s film industry when it was still socially tolerated to cast white actors and actresses in roles portraying the experiences of people of colour. By casting Indigenous people to play Indigenous characters Bailey was consciously underlining the importance of real Indigenous representation in the cinematic industry and clearly positioning herself as an ally to the larger decolonization movement. Furthermore, by using non-professional actors in the film and instructing them to be authentic in their portrayal of their Indigenous culture, values, and language Bailey encouraged a safe space for accurate historical representations from non-colonial perspectives. Even in a modern context it is uncommon for a settler filmmaker, like Norma Bailey, to use actual dialectic representation to ensure proper and distinct Indigenous characterization in the film and television industry. Bailey elicited a charismatic feeling throughout Ikwe by creating a film about the relationships forged through the fur trade by only offering viewers the opportunity to understand the experiences lived by an Indigenous woman. The performances in Ikwe gives a sympathetic dimension to Canadian and Indigenous history while highlighting the innate strength, power, and dignity of Indigenous peoples and Indigenous cultures that have been oppressed by colonial structures of racism and sexism.

Despite being non-Indigenous herself, Norma Bailey works tirelessly within the context of several of her 1980s era films to showcase Indigenous resilience against the oppressive colonial systems working to eradicate them from society. Bailey respectfully reserves her judgment of colonialism from her films and instead highlights the strength of Indigenous people and representation in cinema as an important factor in the decolonization movement. Through Ikwe Norma Bailey accomplishes depicting history through the perspective of the oppressed which is rarely done in colonial society and works towards messages of Indigenous sovereignty and Indigenous feminism. It is through this contextualization that Norma Bailey emerges as an ally in the movements of decolonization and Indigenous feminism.

Bailey encompassed Indigenous feminism in her films by examining how gender and western patriarchal ideologies of conceptions for gender impact historical and contemporary Indigenous peoples. Alongside the ideologies of Indigenous feminism through her a variety of her films, Bailey challenges stereotypes about Indigenous peoples and gender roles by creating cinematic content that is inclusive and representational. Within this framework Norma Bailey can be easily viewed as an ally to the Indigenous feminist movement and the broader decolonization movement. She does not hide behind her position as a white settler filmmaker but rather chooses to use her ability as a filmmaker to create films that showcase Indigenous peoples in a sympathetic yet powerful way that is rarely captured.

Filmography 
 L' artiste (1978)
 Chasing the Eclipse (1979)
 Rice Harvest (1980)
 Nose and Tina (1980)
 Bush Pilot: Reflections on a Canadian Myth (1980)
 It's Hard to Get It Here (1984)
 Discussions in Bioethics: Family Tree (1985)
 The Wake (1986)
 Ikwe (1986)
 Heart Land (1987)
 Martha, Ruth and Edie (1988)
 Women in the Shadows (1992)
 Bordertown Café (1992)
 The True Story of Linda M. (1995)
 My Life as a Dog - "Widgeon" & "The Fugitive" (1995)
 For Those Who Hunt the Wounded Down (1996)
 Nights Below Station Street (1997)
 The Sheldon Kennedy Story (1999)
 Les aventures de Shirley Holmes - " The Case of the Hidden Heart," "The Case of the Desperate Dancer." "The Case of the Falling Star," "The Case of the Vanishing Virus," "The Case of the Forbidden Mountain," "The Case of the Miracle Mine," "The Case of the Broken Oath," "The Case of the Doggone Cats," "The Case of the Exact Change," "The Case of the King of Hearts" (1997-2000)
 Secret Cutting (2000)
 Rivals (2000)
 Tessa, è la pointe de l'épée - "Betrayed" & "End of Days" (2001)
 Un bébé à tout prix (2001)
 2030 CE - "Strange Medicine" & "Free Jake" (2002)
 Mercy Peak - "To Kill a Minah Bird" & "Cruel to Be Kind" (2002)
 The Atwood Stories - "Isis in Darkness" (2003)
 Cowboys and Indians: The J.J Harper Story (2003)
 The Shields Stories - "Hazel" (2004)
 Séduction criminelle (2005)
 Ken Leishman: The Flying Bandit (2005)
 North of Hope (2005)
 8 jours pour mon fils (2006)
 Falcon Beach - "Permanent Collection," "Lovers and Cheaters," "Thirteen Minutes to Midnight," "Sins of the Father," "The Spins," "Desperados," "Trust This," "Summer Solstice," Getting to Know You" (2006-2008)
 The Capture of the Green River Killer - "Épisode #1.2" & "Épisode #1.1"(2008)
 Au-delà des apparence (2009)
 De L'espoir pour Noël (2009)
 L'énigme de la peur (2010)
 Méfiez-vous des apparences (2011)
 Sous l'emprise du pasteur: L'histoire vraie de Mary Winkler (2011)
 An Officer and a Murderer (2012)
 Un tueur au visage d'ange (2013)
 Cracked - "The Hold Out"(2013)
 Le médaillon de noël (2014)
 The Pinkertons - "Mudd and Clay" & "On Account of Huckleberries" (2015)
 La boutique des secrets - "Meurtres en 3 actes" (2016)
 Beauty and the Beast - "Beast of Times, Worst of Times," "Patient X," "Catch Me If You Can" (2014-2016)
 Les enquêtes de Murdoch - "Concocting a Killer" & "A Study in Pink" (2016)
 Heartland - "Sound of Silence," "Faking It," "Eclipse of the Heart" (2015-2017)
 Reign: La Destin d'une reine - "The Shakedown," "Strand Bedfellows," "Wedlock," "Fugitive," "Blood for Blood," "Dirty Laundry" (2014-2017)
 Outlander - "Crème de Menthe" & "A. Malcome" (2017)
 Frankie Drake Mysteries - "Summer in the City" (2017)
 Ransom - "The Client" (2018)
 Mary Kills People - "Girl Problems," "The Ket to Faith," "Ride or Die," "Twin Flames" (2018-2019)
 Anne with an E - "The Summit of My Desires," "A Hope of Meeting You in Another World," "The Determining Acts of Her Life" (2018-2019)
 Spinning Out - "Healing Time May Vary" & "Have a Nice Day!" (2020)
 Project Blue Book - "Broken Arrow," "Curse of the Skinwalker," "The Green Fireballs," "Foo Fighters" (2019-2020)
 Star Trek: Discovery - "Su'Kal" (2020)
 Batwoman - "Gore on Canvas" (2021)
 Superman & Lois - "Holding the Wrench" (2021)
 Home Before Dark - "The Smoking Gun" (2021)
 The Lost Symbol - "Order Eight" (2021)

Awards

American Indian Film Festival

Canadian Screen Awards, CA

Cannes Film Festival

Directors Guild of Canada

Gemini Awards

References

External links 

 Norma Bailey at IMDb
 Watch films by Norma Bailey at the National Film Board of Canada

Canadian women film directors
1949 births
People from Gimli, Manitoba
Film directors from Manitoba
Living people
Canadian women television directors
Canadian television directors
Members of the Order of Manitoba
Canadian Screen Award winners